Helen Bleazard (born 14 August 1990) is a former English–born footballer who played for the Welsh national team and Yeovil Town. She previously played in the FA WSL for Bristol Academy and Chelsea Ladies. Bleazard usually plays as a wide midfielder or forward and switched allegiance to Wales after playing for England at youth level.

Club career
After joining local side Yeovil Town at the age of nine, Bleazard eventually moved on to FA Women's Premier League club Bristol City at the end of season 2004–05.

Bleazard signed a contract with FA WSL club Bristol Academy in February 2011. She helped the club qualify for the UEFA Women's Champions League for the first time, by scoring in a 3–0 FA Women's Cup semi–final win over Liverpool Ladies at Haig Avenue. At the FA Women's Cup final at the Ricoh Arena in May 2011 Bleazard struck the crossbar with a free kick, but Bristol were beaten 2–0 by Arsenal.

In February 2012 Bleazard signed for Bristol's WSL rivals Chelsea Ladies. She played for her new club in the 2012 FA Women's Cup Final, but they lost to Birmingham City on penalties after a 2–2 draw. After two seasons with Chelsea, Bleazard agreed a deal to return to Yeovil, whose application to the new second level of an enlarged WSL has been successful. Yeovil's chairman was enthused by the transfer, describing Bleazard as: "the best female player the town of Yeovil has ever produced."

International career
Bleazard represented England at Under–17 level, and was called into the Under–20 squad during the 2008–09 season. She was also selected for the England college team while attending Yeovil College.

Bleazard later switched her footballing allegiance to Wales and was named on the standby list for their March 2011 Algarve Cup campaign. Bristol Academy teammates Jessica Fishlock and Alex Culvin joked that Bleazard's eligibility for the Welsh national team arose from "her Nan's Sister's Brother's Aunty."

Bleazard won her first senior cap for Wales playing on the left–wing in a 2–0 friendly defeat to New Zealand, played in Savièse on 15 June 2011.

References

External links

Bristol Academy profile
Chelsea profile
Yeovil profile
FAW profile

1990 births
People from Yeovil
Living people
Yeovil Town L.F.C. players
Bristol Academy W.F.C. players
Chelsea F.C. Women players
Wales women's international footballers
FA Women's National League players
Women's Super League players
Welsh women's footballers
Women's association football midfielders
Keynsham Town L.F.C. players